The Taliabu fantail (Rhipidura sulaensis) is a species of bird in the family Rhipiduridae. It is endemic to Taliabu in Indonesia. Its natural habitats are subtropical or tropical moist lowland forests and subtropical or tropical moist montane forests. It was considered conspecific with the rusty-bellied fantail.

References

Taliabu fantail
Birds of the Maluku Islands
Taliabu fantail
Taxa named by Oscar Neumann